The Monza 1000 Kilometers, was the fourth round of the 1980 World Championship for Makes was held at the Autodromo Nazionale Monza, on 27 April. This race was also the third round of the FIA World Challenge for Endurance Drivers and the fourth round of the Italian Championship Group 6.

Report

Entry
A total of 53 cars were entered for the event, across seven classes/divisions ranging through Group 2 up to Group 6, with a class for local prototypes. Of these 40 cars practised.

Qualifying
The pairing of Renzo Zorzi and Claudio Francisci took pole position, in Zorzi’s Capoferri-Ford M1 ahead another Italian Championship runner, the Osella-BMW PA8 of Giorgio Francia and Remo Ramanzini who were nearly one second behind.

Race
Although the race maintained the traditional title of 1000 km of Monza, the race was actually run over 6 hours, the winner covering 183 laps, approximately 1061 km. Alain de Cadenet and Desiré Wilson took the winner spoils for the de Cadenet team, driving their De Cadenet Lola-Cosworth LM1. The pair won in a time of 6hr 01:08.800mins., averaging a speed of 110.211 mph. This race was only decided three laps from the end; the Porsche 935 of Henri Pescarolo had to pit for a little bit of fuel during the rain, so that Wilson could pass and win the race. Close behind was the little Lancia Montecarlo of Riccardo Patrese and Walter Röhrl.

Result
Note: Class winners in bold

Fastest lap: Renzo Zorzi/Claudio Francisci, 1:48.6s (119.468 mph)

References

1980 in motorsport
World Sportscar Championship races
FIA World Challenge for Endurance Drivers
Italian Championship Group 6
6 Hours of Monza